The Lazarus Effect (1983) is the third science fiction novel set in the Destination: Void universe by the American author Frank Herbert and poet Bill Ransom.  It takes place some time after the events in The Jesus Incident (1979).

Plot summary
An indeterminate but several hundreds of years after The Jesus Incident the intelligent kelp has been almost totally destroyed, almost all land on Pandora has been submerged, and been humanity has divided into two cultures: Islanders and Mermen. Islanders live on floating islands, the smallest of which houses at least 10 000 people, and which like much of Islander technology are living creatures. Islanders are genetically unstable due to the clone and genetic experiments of Jesus Lewis. Some are nearly like modern day humans but diversity is wide and accepted, but offspring which are considered dangerous mutations are executed soon after birth. Mermen, who are genetically stable and are much like modern day humans apart from webbed hands and feet, live in submarine cities with a much higher amount of technology, better food, better medicine and an all around higher quality of life. They perform experiments aimed at bringing back both the intelligent kelp and rocketry to gain access to the hybernation tanks on Ship (the intelligent ship which humans created in Destination: Void and which brought the humans to Pandora).

Without kelp acting to control currents, nearly teenage nearly-standard-human Islander Brett is lost over board when the island he is on is struck by a rogue wave. He is rescue by Scudi Wang, a female same-aged Merman and taken to her quarters in an undersea habitat. Due to being the heiress to a large Merman company controlling vital interests like food production and transport, Scudi has become the interest of GeLaar Gallow who wants to co-opt her resources into his insurgency. Gallow, and his terrorist commando subordinates calling themselves Green Dashers (due to them painting their dive suits green as camouflage and after the vicious predator the Hooded Dasher), plan to take control of the hybernation tanks when they arrive from orbit with fauna from Earth as well as humans from the past. Part of Gallow's plan involves gaining access to Vata, the human-kelp hybrid (conceived during the previous novel) who has been dreaming since the death of the kelp and who is under Islander control. He destroyed one of the small floating cities as well as kidnapped Ward Keel, a high ranking Islander who is the Chief Justice in charge of executing or not Islander neonates considered too mutated to be safe to live, in order to pressure the release of Vata into his care.

When Scudi and Brett escape they are pursued by Gallow's commandoes. Due to intervention by Brett's employer, Queets Twisp, who has been looking for them, as well as Islander Bushka who has become mentally unstable (due to guilt over being forced at gunpoint to pilot the submarine that destroyed the island and killed thousands), and the kelp, which has again become sentient, and hylighters (giant hydrogen-filled airship like creatures which are vectors of the kelp that disseminate kelp seeds which have not been seen for centuries) Gallow's conspirators are eliminated, some killed by the kelp invading their hydrofoi boat and dragging the conspirators to drown.

The kelp, identifying itself as Avata communicates with Scudi, Brett and several assorted characters. The hybernation tanks fall and release many creatures including humpback whales. Avata, in the form of hylighters, brings old style humans release from untold centuries or millennia of hybernation to the protagonists boat and thence to small regions of dry land the Merman have created and which will be more stable now that the kelp has awakened and is able to control sea currents. Vata who mysteriously escaped from Islander care is revealed to sleep in the kelp and Ward Keel, who died due to organ failure, is revealed to have had his consciousness absorbed by the kelp as happens to all people whose bodies are placed in kelp when they die.

Major themes
The book deals with concepts such as artificial intelligence, worship and the inherent problems of totalitarianism. It also addresses the issues of clones, genetic engineering and racism.

Reception
Dave Langford reviewed The Lazarus Effect for White Dwarf #50, and stated that "Not top-class Herbert - dunno about Ransom - but far better than its predecessor."

Reviews
Review by William Coyle (1983) in Fantasy Newsletter, #62 September 1983
Review by Stuart Napier (1983) in Science Fiction Review, November 1983
Review by Ken Lake (1984) in Vector 118
Review by Tom Easton (1984) in Analog Science Fiction/Science Fact, February 1984
Review by Frank Catalano (1984) in Amazing Science Fiction, March 1984
Review by Peter Brigg (1984) in Foundation, #30 March 1984
Review [French] by Élisabeth Vonarburg? (1984) in Solaris, #56
Review [French] by Michel Cossement (1984) in SFère, #18
Review [French] by Dominique Warfa (1984) in Fiction, #356
Review [French] by Jean-Pierre Lion (2011) in Bifrost, #63

References

1983 science fiction novels
1983 American novels
American science fiction novels
Destination: Void universe
G. P. Putnam's Sons books
Novels by Frank Herbert
Underwater novels
Novels about genetic engineering
Novels about artificial intelligence